Amedeo Biavati (4 April 1915 – 22 April 1979) was an Italian footballer, who was born in Bologna. He was usually deployed as forward or as a midfielder on the wing. A very fast and creative player, with an eye for goal, precise crossing, and excellent technical ability and dribbling skills, Biavati is regarded as one of the greatest Italian players and wingers of all time, and is largely remembered for popularising the use of notable skills and feints in Italian football, in particular the step over.

Club career
Biavati played in Serie A with Bologna, making his debut on 21 May 1933 in a 7–0 win over Casale. He also played with Catania in Serie B. With Bologna he enjoyed a successful period, winning in particular three Serie A titles during the 1936–1937, 1938–1939, and 1940–1941 seasons, as well as the Torneo Internazionale dell'Expo Universale di Parigi in 1937, and the Coppa Alta Italia in 1946.

International career
Biavati made 18 appearances and scored eight goals for the Italy national football team between 1938 and 1947, and he helped the team to win the 1938 FIFA World Cup in France, as well as the third edition of the Central European International Cup. He made his international debut on 12 June 1938, during the quarter-finals of the 1938 World Cup, as Italy defeated the host nation 3–1. Biavati is often remembered for the notable goal he scored against England in Milan, on 13 May 1939, placing the ball into an empty net after dribbling past the English defenders and the goalkeeper.

Managerial career
After retiring, Biavati attempted to pursue a career as a football manager, albeit unsuccessfully.

Honours

Club
Bologna
Serie A: 1936–37, 1938–39, 1940–41
Torneo Internazionale dell'Expo Universale di Parigi: 1937
Coppa Alta Italia: 1946

International
Italy
FIFA World Cup: 1938
Central European International Cup: 1933–35

References

External links

Statistics at FIGC.it
Profile at Enciclopediadelcalcio.it

1915 births
1979 deaths
Burials at Certosa cemetery
Footballers from Bologna
Italian footballers
Italy international footballers
Bologna F.C. 1909 players
Catania S.S.D. players
1938 FIFA World Cup players
FIFA World Cup-winning players
Association football forwards
Imolese Calcio 1919 players